Kounari is a commune in the Cercle of Mopti in the Mopti Region of Mali. The principal village is Manaco. The commune contains 32 small villages and in 2009 had a population of 5,632, a much smaller number than the 12,654 recorded in 1998.

References

Communes of Mopti Region